Boyds is an unincorporated community and census-designated place (CDP) in Ferry County, Washington, United States. Boyds is located along U.S. Route 395 at the north end of the Lake Roosevelt National Recreation Area on the west side of the Kettle River, which serves as a boundary with Stevens County. Boyds was formerly assigned the ZIP code 99107 and had a 2010 census population of 34.

References

Census-designated places in Ferry County, Washington
Census-designated places in Washington (state)
Populated places in the Okanagan Country